Tautenhain may refer to:

Tautenhain, Thuringia, Germany
Tautenhain, Saxony, Germany